Due to escalating gang activity and high crime rates in Oakland, California Mayor Jean Quan proposed gang injunctions in Oakland, which were passed in May, 2011. These highly controversial injunctions were only proposed for 2 areas of Oakland  – the North side of Oakland and the Fruitvale district. Injunctions were placed in these areas even though the highest crime rates were located in the West Oakland and East Oakland district 6 areas. Opponents of the injunctions cite concerns about the high costs of implementing and maintaining them, as well as the possibility of civil rights violations. They also criticize the motives behind them and raise questions about the actual safety achieved and issues of gentrification. A gang injunction is a court-issued restraining order that prohibits named gang members from participating in a variety of specified activities. A "gang member" is defined as an individual who knowingly belongs to a gang, i.e. has specific intent to be a gang member. Under this definition, gang members have sufficient notice of what constitutes a prohibited "gang association." The goal of gang injunctions are to prevent criminal activity before it occurs and to end the problems that already exist.

Effectiveness

Gang Injunctions have become more common in California because of the rapid growth of gangs in the 1940s-1980s. Criminal activities committed by street gangs strike fear in those who live among them and gang injunctions, in general, can provide a sense of control and security for neighborhoods. However, it is impossible to impose uniform standards on injunctions and a balance must be reached between the need to identify and punish suspected criminals and ensuring that their everyday liberties are not violated.
Gang injunctions seem to be beneficial when they are well thought out and when there are proper channels of communication and dedicated individuals committed to investing their time to accommodate any necessary changes. In order to achieve the most effective outcome, each gang needs to be analyzed and understood before an injunction is implemented. The current ways in which injunctions are placed are not always successful because all gangs are viewed as a homogeneous group and, since many gangs actually function in different ways, some of the injunctions’ processes fail to accommodate each gang's different actions. They are also vague by accusing gang members by association rather than by crime. They may simply arrest a youth because they live in the same block as the gang or because they are of the same racial group. Gang injunctions target minorities as a result of the power that is given to authorities to determine who becomes criminalized and for what crime.  This then becomes an issue of banishing certain racial group in the community rather than actually combatting crime. It has been recorded in 2010 that Oakland's urban population decreased by 25%. This is the result of gerrymandering and the mass incarceration of African Americans. This overall decrease in population has a negative impact on the community, by having less resources, increasing more single-home families and a higher turn to drugs as a way out of this life. This further criminalizes the image of the Blacks and portrays it as an issue of their culture rather than the structure built around incarcerating them. Oppression is then faced by minority groups based on other's perception of them, leading to an arc of incarceration, where they do not need to be arrested and placed in prison to feel that they are unwanted in their community. However, others do argue that injunctions are effective because when they are put into action there is often evidence of less graffiti and less gang gatherings, equating to people feeling safe in their own community. Some experts on gangs also argue that the gang members’ fear of impending injunctions can be effective as the fear of going to prison acts as a deterrent to some crime. Another argument is that the fear that injunctions implement on gang members is what leads to effective injunctions and have This proves the effectiveness of some injunctions as crime rates are known to decrease by five percent in the first year of injunctions. However one main problem, with injunctions is that they are not effective long-term.  There are also problems with the choice of locations where the injunctions are implemented. For instance, the targeted areas are not always where the highest crime rate is taking place. In Oakland 72 percent of homicides occur in West Oakland’s District 3 and East Oakland’s district 6 and 7, which do not have an injunction. Yet people who are in the gang injunction area are more likely to be punished than if they were to live in West Oakland or East Oakland, meaning that most of the crime committed is not being dealt with.

Cost
The use of gang injunctions can end up being very costly to the neighborhoods they are supposed to protect. When an injunction is implemented, the property of the entire community decreases which only exacerbates problems for the whole community rather than only aiming at gangs. The cost of a single gang injunction is approximately 40,000 dollars. The loss of value in properties affected once an injunction is implemented also is costly and can reach a cost of 12.2 billion dollars overall. By providing injunctions, the price of the injunction is being outweighed by the monetary gain of reducing the number of crimes to process.

Alternatives
Gang injunctions often neglect the vast majority of gangs and the wide diversity among them. It is proposed that in order for a gang injunction to be effective and prevent innocent people from being blamed, each gang injunction created needs to be individually framed around the problems that that particular gang creates. Another option is to use the funds that are used to build prisons and invest in education in order to end gentrification and improve the conditions in Oakland. A popular alternative is to implement programs that the community can benefit from, and improve their social and economic conditions. This proposed alternative will provide emotional and social supports such as the gangs often do, without the crime. One proven way to successfully handle gang injunctions is to utilize the use of government-funded social workers to focus on neighborhoods known to have rebellious teens and steer them towards more productive social activities, such as youth centers or youth programs. These interventions would transmit proper values to them and control their behavior. This in fact was successful during the 1960s, but led to failure after the police and  Federal Bureau of Investigation(FBI) used military tactics to control unwanted behavior in the 1960s, but led to an increase in crime and imprisonment.

Way out of list
A major critique of gang injunctions is that it does not provide a clear way of removing a gang member's name from the list, even after they have avoided association with the gang for a period of time. This causes gang members to suffer the consequences and limits their opportunities for growth and gang-free living even after they have not committed any crime. Even for a non-gang member, who might be arbitrarily suspected as a gang member, gang injunctions are broadly implemented without explicitly saying whom they are meant for. This causes  many innocent people to be unfairly included under the gang injunction. Many times, the gang injunctions are issued without the gang members present, which is problematic because many do not realize that they are even being considered a suspect because they are never sent a notice, due to the vagueness of the gang injunction. It is difficult to be removed from the injunction list once you are on it because most of the people whose name appears on the list are not well informed on the options to be removed. Many also do not have access to an attorney due to lack of resources. Some possible solutions to combat these issues is to have local review councils monitor the injunction lists and stay aware of names of individuals who should be removed.  Then attorneys can review the recommendations and act, which keeps the public involved in the process and allows for public sentiments regarding the said non-offenders to help determine whether or not the individual is able to have the name removed from the list. The best solution is to keep the procedure within the City Attorney's office, creating a faster way out.

Violations of civil rights
Critics argue that gang injunctions resemble Black Codes because they both target minority groups and limit their rights as Americans, while maintaining white supremacy. In the year 2000, Proposition 21 was passed, requiring gang members to be registered with the police department and also increased the years of punishment for a gang-related crime, to the extent where they can be sentenced to death penalty. The increase of punishment can be argued that it will lead to higher violations of civil rights, as more power is given to authorities. The Bill of Rights do not apply to the gang injunctions because they are not criminal proceedings, but civil. Bill of Rights violated as pointed out by the American Civil Liberties Union(ACLU) are the 1st amendment of freedom of association and the 5th amendment and 14th amendment rights to due process.  Although it is thought to be keeping the community safe from gang crimes, it is violating the rights of those under the gang injunction at the same time. This increases the life chances for some but limits and causes "premature death" for others. Civil laws do not require as much proof as criminal actions. Therefore, they are easily implemented without requiring exact proof of activity and do not take into account the rights of the gang members that are being violated.

Gentrification

This process of implementing gang injunctions is directly linked to gentrification, because the gang activity in these neighborhoods causes property values to drop, making it more affordable for others to move into the neighborhood. Fruitvale district  and North Side Oakland are now considered as possible prime real estate areas. While gang injunctions are supposed to make Oakland safer and decrease crime, the highest crime rate is actually in West Oakland district 3 and in East Oakland districts 6 and 7, which do not currently have any injunctions in place. Gangs in Fruitvale are primarily of Latino descent and within areas where people who cannot afford the high prices of real estate in other areas, such as San Francisco, are now moving to in large numbers. Law enforcement and judicial practitioners should review spatial depictions of gang activity and crime to ensure that the area is limited to spaces most often frequented by gang members.

References

Gang injunctions
Crime in the San Francisco Bay Area
Crime prevention
Law in the San Francisco Bay Area